Vladimir Vladimirovich Ignatenko (born 17 April 1955) is a Ukrainian former Soviet sprinter who competed in the 100 metres. At the 1978 European Athletics Championships he was the bronze medallist in the 100 m and a member of the bronze medal-winning Soviet 4 × 100 metres relay team, alongside Sergey Vladimirtsev, Nikolay Kolesnikov and Aleksandr Aksinin. Ignatenko won a relay gold medal with Kolesnikov, Aksinin and Juris Silovs at the 1977 Universiade. He also represented his country in the relay at the 1979 IAAF World Cup.

He was a two-time national champion at the Soviet Athletics Championships, completing a 100/200 m double in 1978.

He was born in Nizhyn, Ukrainian SSR, to Vladimir and Halyna Ignatenko, a military officer and primary school teacher respectively. He took up a variety of sports in his youth, including football, cycling and cross-country skiing. He enrolled in the Soviet Army and it was there that his sprint speed was noticed, and his superiors passed him to the army sports team for training. An injury at the end of the 1978 season curtailed his career.

International competitions

National titles
Soviet Athletics Championships
100 m: 1978
200 m: 1978

See also
List of Soviet Athletics Championships winners
List of international medallists in men's 100 metres
List of European Athletics Championships medalists (men)

References

External links

1955 births
Living people
People from Nizhyn
Soviet male sprinters
Ukrainian male sprinters
European Athletics Championships medalists
Universiade gold medalists in athletics (track and field)
Universiade gold medalists for the Soviet Union
Medalists at the 1977 Summer Universiade
Soviet Athletics Championships winners